Cosby High School is a public high school in Midlothian, Virginia, United States. Cosby opened in 2006 and is one of the newest of eleven high schools administered by Chesterfield County Public Schools.

History
Cosby High School was named for its proximity to Cosby Road. Once a major road through the county, it is now only about a mile long, running parallel to the more heavily-trafficked Hull Street Road (US 360). The road's namesake, Wilson Dance Cosby, was a local resident who worked thirty-five years as a county school bus driver. The school includes a health sciences center. In 2015, Cosby was named a National Blue Ribbon School.

Athletics
Cosby High School is a member of group AAA in the Virginia High School League. They are a part of the AAA Central Region and AAA Dominion District. In 2012, they won the Wells Fargo Cup, which honors the VHSL high school with the most prominent athletic department on the state level.

Performing arts 
The CHS Titan Marching Band has been named a Commonwealth of Virginia Honor Band in the past. 

The school also has two competitive show choirs, the mixed-gender "Spotlight" and the all-female "Rhapsody".

Notable people
Alumni
Jake Lowery (2008), baseball player
Terry Williams (2010), Canadian football player
Luis Rendon (2012), soccer player
Troy Caupain (2013), basketball player

Faculty
Bryan Still, football player

References

Public high schools in Virginia
Educational institutions established in 2006
Schools in Chesterfield County, Virginia
2006 establishments in Virginia